Viden Apostolov (17 October 1941 – 13 November 2020) was a Bulgarian football defender who played for Bulgaria in the 1966 FIFA World Cup. He also played for PFC Botev Plovdiv.

Honours
Botev Plovdiv
 Bulgarian League: 1966–67
 Bulgarian Cup: 1961–62
 Balkans Cup: 1972

References

External links

FIFA profile

1941 births
2020 deaths
Bulgarian footballers
Bulgaria international footballers
Association football defenders
FC Lokomotiv 1929 Sofia players
Botev Plovdiv players
1966 FIFA World Cup players
First Professional Football League (Bulgaria) players
People from Sofia City Province